The Woodbury Telephone Company was a telephone company that served the Connecticut towns of Woodbury, Southbury, Bethlehem, and parts of Roxbury and Oxford.  In 1997, Woodbury Telephone was acquired by Southern New England Telecommunications.  In 1998, SNET merged with SBC Communications and Woodbury Telephone, the 75th largest independent telephone carrier in the United States, continued as a separate operating company under Southern New England Telephone.

On June 1, 2007, the company was dissolved and merged all assets and operations into Southern New England Telephone.

History
Woodbury Telephone began operation in the 1870s when a local businessman, Mr. Charles A. Stone visited the Philadelphia Centennial Exposition 1876 and realized the value of connecting his grain and feed store to the Southbury Railroad Station via the telephone.  The company grew modestly and was incorporated in 1910 with Arthur D. Warner as its first President.  The company continued in operation and upgraded from a manual switchboard to a direct dial system in 1955.  As the service area grew considerably in the 1970s and 1980s the company deployed digital switching, fiber optic network architecture and in the 1990s it successfully introduced internet service with broadband access.

At the time of its acquisition by SNET, the company had 19,000 lines.

Other historical notes
Woodbury Telephone was the only local telephone operating company SBC/AT&T owned that had no roots in the original AT&T or Alexander Graham Bell.
There were five other independent telephone companies that served parts of Connecticut and were bought by SNET:  Lebanon (1912), East Haven (1925), Collinsville (1939), Sharon (1943) and Huntington (1948).

References

Frontier Communications
Former AT&T subsidiaries
Communications in Connecticut
American companies established in 1870
Telecommunications companies disestablished in 2007
2007 mergers and acquisitions
Woodbury, Connecticut
Defunct companies based in Connecticut
Defunct telecommunications companies of the United States